Wyman School, also known as Excelsior Springs High School (and later Wyman Public/Elementary School until the mid-1990s), is a historic school building located at Excelsior Springs, Clay County, Missouri. It was built in 1912, and is a three-story, rectangular brick building with Classical Revival design elements.  It has a flat roof and sits in a limestone foundation.  Also on the property is the contributing power plant (1913) and a classroom annex (a non-historic prefabricated building that sits west of the power plant).

After classes ended, the building was used as a community theatre before becoming vacant. It was listed on the National Register of Historic Places in 2008.

References

School buildings on the National Register of Historic Places in Missouri
Neoclassical architecture in Missouri
School buildings completed in 1912
Buildings and structures in Clay County, Missouri
National Register of Historic Places in Clay County, Missouri
1912 establishments in Missouri